Mar Mar Aye is a prolific Burmese singer and considered one of the most  successful female singers in the history of Burmese classical music.

Early life and career
She was born Aye Myint in Myaungmya, a town in the Irrawaddy delta to musician parents. Her father, U Aye, was a hne (flute) musician while her mother Than Hnit was a singer with the stage name Myaungmya Than. She began singing at an early age. By the 1980s, 80% of film soundtracks were sung by Mar Mar Aye.

She emigrated to Fort Wayne, Indiana in the United States in 1998. She has been politically active. During the Saffron Revolution, she released a song entitled "Heartache Till the End of the World". In 2012, she returned from exile to Myanmar, at the authorization of President Thein Sein.

On 25 July 2012, she released a Burmese language memoir, Dear Friend, Look Deeply Into My Heart, which recounts the aftermath of her divorce in 1970.

Discography

Solo albums

 (Love and Virtue)

 (Kyi Kyi Htay's Mar Mar Aye)
 (Eating a Snack)
 (Sounds of Auspiciousness)

 (Lady Water Buffalo)
 (A Thousand Ceylon Ironwood Flowers)

 (The Eight Victories)

 (Emerald Flower Cassette)

 (Eugenia Gold)

 (Dark Blue Paso)
 (Golden Rose)

 (Dharmacakra)

 (Sister-in-Law)
 (Colors of the Buddhist Sasana)

Collaboration albums

 (Metta Bridge) - with May Sweet
 (Records of the Radio) - with Tin Tin Mya and Cho Pyone

Filmography
Mya Chu Than
Ko Chit Thu Hma De
Mandali

Notes

References

People from Ayeyarwady Region
1942 births
Living people
20th-century Burmese women singers
21st-century Burmese women singers